Quasistatic can refer to:
 Quasistatic process
 Quasistatic equilibrium
 Quasistatic loading
 Quasistatic approximation